The Pawnshop was Charlie Chaplin's sixth film for Mutual Film Corporation. Released on October 2, 1916, it stars Chaplin in the role of assistant to the pawnshop owner, played by Henry Bergman. Edna Purviance plays the owner's daughter, while Albert Austin appears as an alarm clock owner who watches Chaplin in dismay as he dismantles the clock; the massive Eric Campbell's character attempts to rob the shop.

This was one of Chaplin's more popular movies for Mutual, mainly for the slapstick comedy he was famous for at the time.

Synopsis
Chaplin plays an assistant in a pawnshop run by Henry Bergman. He goes about his job in the usual comic Chaplin manner: insulting various eccentric customers and dusting an electric fan while it is running. Quarreling over a ladder, Chaplin engages in a slapstick battles with his fellow pawnshop assistant and is fired. The pawnbroker gives Charlie a second chance because of his "eleven children"—a fiction which Charlie has hastily invented for the occasion. In the kitchen Charlie flirts with the pawnbroker's attractive daughter, helping her dry dishes by passing them through a clothes wringer. When a customer brings in an alarm clock to be pawned, Chaplin engages in one of his most famous solo sustained comedy bits: He thoroughly examines the clock as if he were a physician and a jeweler. He disassembles the clock piece by piece, damaging it beyond repair, and carefully puts the pieces into the man's hat. He then sorrowfully informs him that the clock can not be accepted.

A crook enters the store and pretends he wants to buy diamonds. Charlie, who has hidden in a trunk after another raucous dispute with his co-worker, spots the man trying to open the pawnshop's vault. Charlie emerges from the trunk, knocks the armed thief out. Charlie is congratulated by the pawnbroker and embraced by his daughter for his bravery and good deed.

The role of the pawnshop proprietor was Henry Bergman's first major appearance in a Chaplin film. (He had played a minor, uncredited role as an old man in The Floorwalker earlier in 1916.) Bergman would work closely with Chaplin until his death in 1946.

Primary cast

Charles Chaplin: Pawnbroker's assistant
Henry Bergman: Pawnbroker
Edna Purviance: His daughter
John Rand: Pawnbroker's assistant
Albert Austin: Client with clock
Wesley Ruggles: Client with ring
Eric Campbell: Thief
James T. Kelley: Old bum
Charlotte Mineau: Client with aquarium
Frank J. Coleman: Policeman

Sound version
In 1932, Amedee J. Van Beuren of Van Beuren Studios, purchased Chaplin's Mutual comedies for $10,000 each, added music by Gene Rodemich and Winston Sharples and sound effects, and re-released them through RKO Radio Pictures. Chaplin had no legal recourse to stop the RKO release.

See also
Charlie Chaplin filmography

References

External links

The Pawnshop at Internet Archive

1916 films
1916 comedy films
1916 short films
American silent short films
Short films directed by Charlie Chaplin
American black-and-white films
Silent American comedy films
Articles containing video clips
American comedy short films
Mutual Film films
1910s American films